Muus is a surname. Notable people with the surname include:

Abraham Falk Muus (1789–?), Norwegian jurist and politician
Bernt Julius Muus (1832–1900), Norwegian-American Lutheran minister and church leader
Didrik Muus (1633/7-1706), Norwegian priest, painter, copper engraver and sculptor
Flemming Muus (1907–1982), Danish author and resistance fighter
Jane Muus (1919–2007), Danish painter and illustrator
Rudolf Muus (1862–1935), Norwegian author
Varinka Wichfeld Muus (1922–2002), Danish resistance fighter

See also
Muuss
Muus v. Muus, 1879 lawsuit